Company Sergeant Major George Harold Eardley VC, MM (6 May 1912 – 11 September 1991) was a British Army soldier and an English recipient of the Victoria Cross (VC), the highest award for gallantry in the face of the enemy that can be awarded to British and Commonwealth forces. Brother of Arnold Eardley and Elgin Eardley.

Eardley was 32 years old, and an acting sergeant in the 4th Battalion, King's Shropshire Light Infantry, British Army during the Second World War when he was awarded the VC.

Sergeant Eardley spotted one of these posts and moving forward under heavy fire killed the officer at the post with a grenade. He went on to destroy two more posts single-handed, under fire so intense that it daunted those who were with him, but his action enabled the platoon to achieve its objective and thus ensured the success of the whole attack.

He later was appointed company sergeant major (CSM).

Eardley was interred at Macclesfield Cemetery in Cheshire.

His VC is on display in the Lord Ashcroft Gallery at the Imperial War Museum, London. A statue was erected in his home town of Congleton on 18 April 2004.

See also
List of Second World War Victoria Cross recipients

References

The Register of the Victoria Cross (This England, 1997)

External links
Location of grave and VC medal (Cheshire)

1912 births
1991 deaths
British Army personnel of World War II
British Army recipients of the Victoria Cross
British World War II recipients of the Victoria Cross
King's Shropshire Light Infantry soldiers
People from Congleton
Queen's Royal Regiment soldiers
Recipients of the Military Medal
Military personnel from Cheshire